Tyronne James Drakeford (born June 21, 1971) is a former American football cornerback in the National Football League.  He played for the San Francisco 49ers, New Orleans Saints, and Washington Redskins.  He played college football at Virginia Tech and was drafted in the second round of the 1994 NFL Draft.

References

1971 births
Living people
American football cornerbacks
New Orleans Saints players
San Francisco 49ers players
Virginia Tech Hokies football players
Washington Redskins players
People from Camden, South Carolina
Players of American football from South Carolina
African-American coaches of American football
African-American players of American football
21st-century African-American sportspeople
20th-century African-American sportspeople